Tarapatino is a rural locality (a selo) and the administrative center of Tarapatinskoye Rural Settlement, Zhirnovsky District, Volgograd Oblast, Russia. The population was 324 as of 2010. There are 6 streets.

Geography 
Tarapatino is located in steppe of Volga Upland, on the left bank of the Shchelkan River, 32 km west of Zhirnovsk (the district's administrative centre) by road. Osichki is the nearest rural locality.

References 

Rural localities in Zhirnovsky District